Cinachyra antarctica is a species of  antarctic sponge belonging to the family Tetillidae. It was first described by H.J. Carter in 1872. A 2002 study in Antarctica calculated that this sponge and another antarctic sponge, Anoxycalyx joubini, have amazingly long lifespans surpassing 1,550 years in C. antarctica and 15,000 years in A. joubini. A. joubini lives in deeper waters than C. antarctica. This may slow down their growth rate and other biological processes, which has a remarkable lifespan as a result, because in a caught specimen of A. joubini (which barely measures more than 2 cm) did not show any growth in a span of 10 years. C. antarctica lives at the bottom, as a benthic, sessile creature. Complete specimens have large, visible pores and an overall yellowish appearance with hair-like structures covering some parts next to the pores, giving it the look of a giant virus. Caught specimens are usually incomplete and rarely measure more than 2.5–3 cm.

References

Sponges described in 1872
Spirophorida